The Unknown Ocean is a 1964 Australian documentary film directed by Malcolm Otton.

References

External links

1964 films
1960s short documentary films
Australian documentary films
1960s English-language films